

164001–164100 

|-id=006
| 164006 Thierry ||  || Thierry Christophe (born 1948), French entomologist and brother of astronomer Bernard Christophe who discovered this minor planet || 
|}

164101–164200 

|-id=130
| 164130 Jonckheere ||  || Robert Louis Charles Jonckheere (1888–1974), French amateur astronomer who observed visual double stars || 
|}

164201–164300 

|-id=215
| 164215 Doloreshill ||  || Dolores H. Hill (born 1956), American meteoriticist || 
|-id=268
| 164268 Hajmási ||  || József Hajmási (1910–2010), Hungarian physicist, teacher and amateur astronomer || 
|}

164301–164400 

|-bgcolor=#f2f2f2
| colspan=4 align=center | 
|}

164401–164500 

|-bgcolor=#f2f2f2
| colspan=4 align=center | 
|}

164501–164600 

|-id=518
| 164518 Patoche ||  || Patrice Christophe (born 1945), French architect and brother of astronomer Bernard Christophe who discovered this minor planet. "Patoche" is his nickname. || 
|-id=536
| 164536 Davehinson ||  || David P. Hinson (born 1954), a Senior Research Scientist at Stanford University, served as a Co-Investigator for Radio Science for the New Horizons Mission to Pluto. || 
|-id=585
| 164585 Oenomaos ||  || King Oenomaus of Pisa was the son of Ares by Harpina and father of Hippodamia || 
|-id=586
| 164586 Arlette ||  || Arlette Naef (born 1949), wife of Swiss amateur astronomer Peter Kocher who discovered this minor planet || 
|-id=587
| 164587 Taesch || 2007 OS || Paul Taesch (1927–), early astronomical mentor of French amateur astronomer Claudine Rinner who discovered this minor planet || 
|-id=589
| 164589 La Sagra ||  || La Sagra, at 2382 meters the highest peak of the Cordillera Subbética mountain range of southern Spain and home of the discovering La Sagra Observatory || 
|}

164601–164700 

|-bgcolor=#f2f2f2
| colspan=4 align=center | 
|}

164701–164800 

|-
| 164701 Horanyi ||  || Mihaly Horanyi (born 1955) is Professor of Physics at the University of Colorado, who served as a science team Co-Investigator and as the Principal Investigator of the Student Dust Counter instrument for the New Horizons Mission to Pluto. || 
|-id=791
| 164791 Nicinski ||  || Tom Nicinski (born 1960), American software engineer with the Sloan Digital Sky Survey || 
|-id=792
| 164792 Owen ||  || Russell Owen (born 1959), American engineer with the Sloan Digital Sky Survey || 
|}

164801–164900 

|-bgcolor=#f2f2f2
| colspan=4 align=center | 
|}

164901–165000 

|-bgcolor=#f2f2f2
| colspan=4 align=center | 
|}

References 

164001-165000